The 2016 LPGA of Korea Tour is the 39th season of the LPGA of Korea Tour, the professional golf tour for women operated by the Korea Ladies Professional Golf' Association. It consists of 37 golf tournaments, 31 played in South Korea, three in China, two in Vietnam, and one in Japan.

Schedule
The number in parentheses after winners' names show the player's total number wins in official money individual events on the LPGA of Korea Tour, including that event.

Events in bold are majors.

External links
 

LPGA of Korea Tour
LPGA of Korea Tour